Wētā Workshop is a special effects and prop company based in Miramar, Wellington, in New Zealand, that produces effects for television and film. The company is named after the New Zealand wētā, one of the world's largest insects.

History

Founded in 1987 by Richard Taylor and Tania Rodger as RT Effects, Wētā Workshop has produced creatures and makeup effects for the TV series Hercules: The Legendary Journeys and Xena: Warrior Princess and effects for films such as Meet the Feebles and Heavenly Creatures. A digital division, Weta Digital (now Wētā FX), was formed in 1993; it is a separate company and operates independently.

Wētā Workshop's output was used in director Peter Jackson's film trilogies The Lord of the Rings and The Hobbit, producing sets, costumes, armor, weapons, creatures and miniatures. It also aided in the making of Jackson's 2005 version of King Kong.
It supported the creation of Reclaiming the Blade (2009), a documentary film on stage combat, historical European and Asian swordsmanship.

Wētā Workshop made its American musical theatre debut in 2022 with Workshop designer Rebekah Tisch serving as the art director for the musical stage production of Other World at Delaware Theatre Company, creating a digital world for live stage.

Innovations

Chainmaille 

For the Lord of the Rings film trilogy, realistic looking PVC chainmail was made, not just for the lead actors, but also for the hundreds of extras that appeared throughout the films. PVC pipe was cut into rings, assembled by hand into a semblance of armor, and then electroplated. A total of 82.9 million links were manufactured from 7 miles of PVC pipe.

Wētā Workshop makes chainmaille for film and creative industries using new techniques developed in-house. PVC injection was used for the armor in Kingdom of Heaven, giving better results than the process for Lord of the Rings. It produces aluminium or steel mail for high-impact stuntwork.

Bigatures

The term bigature is Wētā Workshop's nickname for a very large miniature model. They are used in the Lord of the Rings film trilogy, with the largest of them measuring some 9 metres high. Extensive computer graphics techniques and computer-controlled cameras were used to seamlessly mesh the Bigature photography with live actors and scenes.

Bigatures used in The Lord of the Rings film trilogy included models of:

 The Hornburg – the mountain fortress of the Rohirrim
 The Grey Havens – the Elven harbour
 Minas Tirith – the White City of Gondor
 Rivendell – Elrond's city for the Elves
 Caras Galadhon – Galadriel's city in Lothlórien
 Argonath – the gateway into Gondor, two statues of Elendil and Isildur
 Osgiliath – the ruined City of Gondor
 Orthanc – Saruman's tower
 Cirith Ungol – the tower that guards the pass of Shelob
 Paths of the Dead – City of the Dead Men of Dunharrow
 Minas Morgul – Sauron's 'Dead City'
 Barad-dûr – Sauron's massive tower
 The Black Gate – the gate guarding the gap between the Ered Lithui and the Ephel Dúath
 Grond – the battering ram that smashed down the gates of Minas Tirith
 Mûmakil – large war elephants used by the Haradrim

People

 Jonathon Brough works as a designer / props finisher

Workplace culture 

Beginning in June 2020, an investigative project by Kiwi public TV broadcaster 1 News into Wētā's workplace culture resulted in over 11 current and former Wētā Workshop employees anonymously sharing accounts of "bullying and harassment". Another former employee Layna Lazar came public with her own allegation by social media posting the same month that she was sexually harassed repeatedly and after seeking recourse, was fired, this prompted an independent review by Hive Consulting; in December of that year. Their reviewer Ashley Benefield cleared the company of the allegations stating that "the majority of allegations in the post including the most serious allegations, have either not been substantiated or were reasonable in the context of circumstances not described in the post". The review's December 2020 report did not address the anonymous allegations of over 11 employees originally reported by 1 News back in July, and the concerned employees stated in response they were not informed of the review having finished, either, in spite of their reluctant cooperation in it. Lazar stated in response that she "genuinely 100 percent still" stands by her public allegations.

Film

Television

References

Further reading
Official Companies Office Data

External links 
 Wētā Workshop
 Weta Digital

Film production companies of New Zealand
Special effects companies
Wellington City
Entertainment companies established in 1987
Companies based in Wellington
Privately held companies of New Zealand
Toy companies of New Zealand
Science and technology in New Zealand
New Zealand companies established in 1987